These are the international rankings of Belgium.

International rankings

References 

Belgium